Domokos Szollár (born 20 August 1975) is a Hungarian businessman. He was the spokesman of the Hungarian government from 15 May 2009 to 29 May 2010. Before that he served as spokesman of the Budapest Ferihegy International Airport. He criticized the strikers powerfully in his declarations. During an interview Szollár told the reporter that he voted for the Politics Can Be Different party on the 2010 Hungarian elections, in spite of that fact he worked for the government which consists of the Hungarian Socialist Party.

References
 Kormanyszovivo.hu

1975 births
Living people
Government spokespersons of Hungary